HOT-17 (2,5-dimethoxy-4-(β-isobutylthio)-N-hydroxyphenethylamine) is a psychedelic phenethylamine of the 2C family.  It was synthesized by Alexander Shulgin and reported in his book PiHKAL.

Chemistry

HOT-17's full chemical name is 2-[4-(2-isobutylthio)-2,5-dimethoxyphenyl-N-hydroxyethanamine.  It has structural properties similar to 2C-T-17 and to other drugs in the HOT- series, with the most closely related compounds being HOT-2 and HOT-7.

General information

The dosage range of HOT-17 is typically 70-120 mg and its duration is approximately 12–18 hours according to Shulgin.  HOT-17 produces time distortion and general psychedelia.  It also has little to no body load.

See also
Phenethylamine

References

Psychedelic phenethylamines
Thioethers
Phenol ethers
Hydroxylamines